opened in Nagasaki, Nagasaki Prefecture, Japan, in 2005. Alongside the Nagasaki Museum of History and Culture, which opened the same year, it supersedes and replaces the former , which closed at the end of 2002.

See also

 List of Cultural Properties of Japan - paintings (Nagasaki)

References

External links
  Nagasaki Prefectural Art Museum
  Nagasaki Prefectural Art Museum
 Collection Database

Kengo Kuma buildings
Museums in Nagasaki
Art museums and galleries in Japan
Museums established in 2005
2005 establishments in Japan